Afrique verte ("Green Africa") is a French NGO engaged in the Sahel region of Africa, specifically Mali, Niger and Burkina Faso. Its objective is to ensure food security in the region, and on a larger scale, sustainable development. Its activities include training for better marketing of agriculture related goods, allowing a better exchange between zones of too much and too little food.

External links
Afrique Verte Official Homepage (English)

Development charities based in France
Foreign charities operating in Burkina Faso
Foreign charities operating in Mali
Foreign charities operating in Niger